Burkinabé Party for Refoundation (in French: Parti Burkinabè pour la Refondation, PBR) is a Sankarist political party in Burkina Faso, led by Gilbert Bouda.

As PBR candidate, Bouda ran in the 13 November 2005 presidential election, placing 9th out of 13 candidates with 1.05% of the vote.

Political parties in Burkina Faso
Sankarist political parties in Burkina Faso